Paul Sauvage (17 March 1939 – 17 December 2019) was a French footballer.

During his club career he played for Limoges FC (1957–1960, 1970–1972), Stade de Reims (1960–1964), US Valenciennes Anzin (1964–1967), and Castets-en-Dorthes (1967–1970), and won the French championship with Reims in 1962. He earned 6 caps for the France national football team from 1961 to 1965, and was part of the squad that competed in the 1960 European Nations' Cup.

Personal life
Sauvage died in Bordeaux on 17 December 2019 at the age of 80.

References

External links
FFF Profile

1939 births
2019 deaths
French footballers
France international footballers
1960 European Nations' Cup players
Stade de Reims players
Valenciennes FC players
Limoges FC players
Ligue 1 players
Association football forwards